Casey Station, commonly called Casey, is one of three permanent stations and research outposts in Antarctica managed by the Australian Antarctic Division (AAD). Casey lies on the northern side of the Bailey Peninsula overlooking Vincennes Bay on the Budd Coast of Wilkes Land in the Australian Antarctic Territory, a territory claimed by Australia. Casey is  due south of Perth, Western Australia.

Casey was named in honour of Richard, Baron Casey.

History 
Casey is close to the now-abandoned Wilkes Station, established by the United States of America to support science and exploration of Antarctica during the International Geophysical Year (IGY) in 1957–1958.

Australia took Wilkes over after the IGY, but the American buildings were already unusable due to the build-up of ice around them.  Australia built the first Casey Base, originally as "Repstat", referring to "replacement station", on the opposite south side of the Newcomb Bay in 1964, with works completed in February 1969.  This set of buildings was a unique attempt to prevent the problem of ice build-up by elevating the buildings on stilts, to encourage the wind to blow beneath as well as above, and connecting the entire line of buildings with a corrugated iron tunnel. This would, it was hoped, clear the buildup of snow each year, while allowing personnel to move between buildings without having to brave the elements.  It worked for some time until corrosion occurred.

The current Casey Station headquarters (the "Red Shed") was built in the late 1980s as part of the Australian Government's Antarctic Re-building Program.  It was prefabricated in Hobart, Tasmania, by Hobart construction firm Contas Pty Ltd; trial-erected on the wharf at Hobart; then dismantled, packaged and shipped to Antarctica.  Erected at Casey by tradespeople employed as workers on the normal summer expedition crews, it incorporates innovative design features to prevent the transfer of heat through the structure.  The "Shed" is conspicuously located near the top of the hill on which the old radio masts stood.  It is probably the largest single structure on Antarctica and was first occupied in 1988. The station has two other sheds, the green shed for storing food and the yellow shed for brewing. Homebrew beer is served at the station's bar, "Splinters".

Current research
Since 2008, scientists based at Casey have contributed to research into study of the Law Dome, the bedrock geology and structure of the East Antarctic ice sheet and its glaciological processes. In more recent years, Casey has served as a base for marine biologists to examine changes to polar seafloor communities exposed to different carbon dioxide concentrations. Adélie penguin research is conducted at Casey. Scientists are also studying the influence of climate change and human impact on extensive and well developed moss beds that grow at and near Casey.

Infrastructure

Access methods
Access to Casey is possible via a four-hour flight from Hobart, followed by a four-hour ride in an over-snow bus.

Road
The old and new stations are connected by a  road.

Earth stations

Casey has a dome-covered satellite tracking antenna.  The antenna was upgraded in March 2016 to communicate with a Himawari-8 satellite, allowing the station to monitor and track weather related information. There is also an ANARESAT satellite for communication.

Airstrips

The inaugural landing of the AAD's Airbus A319 aircraft was on the evening of 9 December 2007.

In March 2009, the Australian ABC Foreign Correspondent international affairs television program featured air operations at Casey Station as part of a report titled Antarctica - What Lies Beneath.

See also
 Brown Bay
 List of Antarctic research stations
 List of Antarctic field camps
 List of airports in Antarctica

Climate 
Casey Station experiences a tundra climate:
This station experienced record warm temperatures and precipitation due to an unprecedented atmospheric river event in March 2022.

References

External links

 AAD Casey Station page
 Casey Station webcam
 A Year In Antarctica (1972)
 COMNAP Antarctic Facilities
 COMNAP Antarctic Facilities Map

Outposts of Antarctica
Wilkes Land
1969 establishments in Australia
Earth stations in the Antarctic Territory Australia
1969 establishments in Antarctica